The Ben Hill County School District is a public school district in Ben Hill County, Georgia, United States, based in Fitzgerald. It serves the communities of Fitzgerald and Queensland.

Schools
The Ben Hill County School District has four elementary schools, one middle school, and one high school.

Elementary schools 
Ben Hill County PreK
Ben Hill County Primary School
Ben Hill County Elementary School
Ben Hill County Even Start

Middle school
Ben Hill Middle School

High school
Fitzgerald High School

Defunct schools
Monitor Elementary-High School

References

External links

Ben Hill County Schools
Ben Hill County School District

School districts in Georgia (U.S. state)
Education in Ben Hill County, Georgia